Anastasios "Tasos" Karamanos (born 21 September 1990) is a Greek professional footballer who plays as a forward for Super League club Lamia.

Club career
He started his career in 2008 with local team Aspropyrgos, and the following year he signed for Delta Ethniki side Asteras Magoula. He lifted the Greek Amateur Cup in 2011 with Asteras.

In the summer of 2011, he signed for Atromitos. He made his debut in the Greek Superleague during a home game against Levadiakos, coming as a substitute in the 74th minute. During the 2014 summer transfer window, he signed a contract with Olympiakos involving a 12-month loan back length clause to Atromitos.

In the summer of 2015, he signed another year-long loan to Panionios on loan from Olympiakos. He finished the season having 36 appearances (6 goals, 2 assists) in all competitions.

On 1 August 2016 Karamanos moved to Portuguese Primeira Liga outfit Feirense on another season-long deal. On Matchday 1 of the Primeira Liga on August 26, he netted his first goal contributing to a 2-0 away victory over Estoril. On 13 September 2016, he scored a brace to help his team achieve a 2-1 home win against Tondela. Karamanos' fourth and final goal for Feirense arrived on October 31, after an assist from Jean Sony Alcénat, in what was the only Feirense goal in the team's 1-1 away draw against Chaves. On 30 April 2017, he scored with a wonderful finish after an assist of Vítor Bruno, opening the score in a 2-1 home win against Marítimo.

On 2 June 2017, according to Portuguese newspaper "A Bola," Olympiacos offers Karamanos to Vitória de Guimarães to persuade the Portuguese club to make back to its demands and to resolve the issue with Pedro Martins clause, in order to join Greek champions as the new head coach. On 14 July 2017, Karamanos will continue his career in Portugal signing  a long season contract with Primeira Liga club Rio Ave on loan from Olympiakos. It is worth noting that his  contract has a buying clause of €1.5 million.

On 21 January 2018, Feirense officially announced their deal with Karamanos. The 28-year-old player returned in Santa Maria da Feira based club after his last season there on loan from  Olympiakos until the forthcoming summer. After a rather mediocre season, Karamanos besides the fact that has a contract with Olympiakos, is in search of a club as he is not in the plans of the new coach of Olympiakos Pedro Martins. On 28 August 2018, after almost four years without having an appearance with Olympiakos, Karamanos mutually solved his contract with the club, seeking the next club in his career.

On 30 August 2018, one day before the end of the transfer window, Karamanos signed a contract with Lamia. His first goal in the league came in a 3-1 away win against OFI, after he received a wonderful through ball from Facundo Bertoglio and chipped Giorgos Strezos to secure the win, on 18 February 2019. On 10 March 2019, he scored with a header in a 1-1 home draw against PAS Giannina.
On 30 March 2019, he scored an early goal sealing a vital 1-0 home win game against Panionios.

Career statistics

Honours

Club
Atromitos
Greek Cup runner-up: 2011–12

References

External links

Sport.gr profile 

1990 births
Living people
Greek footballers
Greek expatriate footballers
Delta Ethniki players
Gamma Ethniki players
Primeira Liga players
Super League Greece players
Asteras Magoula F.C. players
Olympiacos F.C. players
Panionios F.C. players
Atromitos F.C. players
C.D. Feirense players
Rio Ave F.C. players
PAS Lamia 1964 players
Expatriate footballers in Portugal
Greek expatriate sportspeople in Portugal
Association football wingers
Association football forwards
People from Aspropyrgos
Footballers from Attica